Keladighat Bridge is a motor-able bridge over Kali Gandaki river in Keladighat of Syangja District,  Gandaki Zone and Gandakidhik of Palpa District , Lumbini Zone, Western Region, Nepal. 166.6 meter long and 4.25 meter wide bridge is completed now.

Gallery

References

External links
http://www.ekantipur.com
http://www.ekantipur.com/tkp/

Bridges in Nepal
2014 establishments in Nepal